Ruslan Khanipov (born 29 March 1989) is a Russian volleyball player, a member of the club VC Yaroslavich.

Sporting achievements

Clubs 
Russian Super League:
  2013
  2010
  2011, 2014, 2016
Russian Cup:
  2012, 2013
Russian SuperCup:
  2013
CEV Champions League:
  2014
CEV Cup:
  2018

References

External links
Volley Service profile
Volleyball-Movies profile
CEV profile

1989 births
Living people
Russian men's volleyball players